Rostaq District is a district (bakhsh) in Darab County, Fars Province, Iran. At the 2006 census, its population was 14,241, in 3,402 families.  The District has no cities. The District has two rural districts (dehestan): Kuhestan Rural District and Rostaq Rural District.

References 

Darab County
Districts of Fars Province